Angiotensin is a peptide hormone that causes vasoconstriction and an increase in blood pressure. It is part of the renin–angiotensin system, which regulates blood pressure. Angiotensin also stimulates the release of aldosterone from the adrenal cortex to promote sodium retention by the kidneys.

An oligopeptide, angiotensin is a hormone and a dipsogen. It is derived from the precursor molecule angiotensinogen, a serum globulin produced in the liver. Angiotensin was isolated in the late 1930s (first named 'angiotonin' or 'hypertensin') and subsequently characterized and synthesized by groups at the Cleveland Clinic and Ciba laboratories.

Precursor and types

Angiotensinogen 

Angiotensinogen is an α-2-globulin synthesized in the liver and is a precursor for angiotensin, but has also been indicated as having many other roles not related to angiotensin peptides. It is a member of the serpin family of proteins, leading to another name: Serpin A8, although it is not known to inhibit other enzymes like most serpins. In addition, a generalized crystal structure can be estimated by examining other proteins of the serpin family, but angiotensinogen has an elongated N-terminus compared to other serpin family proteins. Obtaining actual crystals for X-ray diffractometric analysis is difficult in part due to the variability of glycosylation that Angiotensinogen exhibits. The non-glycosylated and fully glycosylated states of angiotensinogen also vary in molecular weight, the former weighing 53kDa and the latter weighing 75kDa, with a plethora of partially glycosylated states weighing in between these two values.

Angiotensinogen is also known as renin substrate. It is cleaved at the N-terminus by renin to result in angiotensin I, which will later be modified to become angiotensin II. This peptide is 485 amino acids long, and 10 N-terminus amino acids are cleaved when renin acts on it. The first 12 amino acids are the most important for activity.

 Asp-Arg-Val-Tyr-Ile-His-Pro-Phe-His-Leu-Val-Ile-...

Plasma angiotensinogen levels are increased by plasma corticosteroid, estrogen, thyroid hormone, and angiotensin II levels. In mice with a full body deficit of angiotensinogen, the effects observed were low newborn survival rate, stunted body weight gain, stunted growth, and abnormal renal development.

Angiotensin I 

Asp-Arg-Val-Tyr-Ile-His-Pro-Phe-His-Leu | Val-Ile-...

Angiotensin I (CAS# 11128-99-7), officially called proangiotensin, is formed by the action of renin on angiotensinogen. Renin cleaves the peptide bond between the leucine (Leu) and valine (Val) residues on angiotensinogen, creating the decapeptide (ten amino acid) (des-Asp) angiotensin I. Renin is produced in the kidneys in response to renal sympathetic activity, decreased intrarenal blood pressure (<90mmHg systolic blood pressure ) at the juxtaglomerular cells, dehydration or decreased delivery of Na+ and Cl- to the macula densa.  If a reduced NaCl concentration in the distal tubule is sensed by the macula densa, renin release by juxtaglomerular cells is increased. This sensing mechanism for macula densa-mediated renin secretion appears to have a specific dependency on chloride ions rather than sodium ions. Studies using isolated preparations of thick ascending limb with glomerulus attached in low NaCl perfusate were unable to inhibit renin secretion when various sodium salts were added but could inhibit renin secretion with the addition of chloride salts. This, and similar findings obtained in vivo, has led some to believe that perhaps "the initiating signal for MD control of renin secretion is a change in the rate of NaCl uptake predominantly via a luminal Na,K,2Cl co-transporter whose physiological activity is determined by a change in luminal Cl concentration."

Angiotensin I appears to have no direct biological activity and exists solely as a precursor to angiotensin II.

Angiotensin II 

Asp-Arg-Val-Tyr-Ile-His-Pro-Phe

Angiotensin I  is converted to angiotensin II (AII) through removal of two C-terminal residues by the enzyme angiotensin-converting enzyme (ACE), primarily through ACE within the lung (but also present in endothelial cells, kidney epithelial cells, and the brain). Angiotensin II acts on the central nervous system to increase vasopressin production, and also acts on venous and arterial smooth muscle to cause vasoconstriction. Angiotensin II also increases aldosterone secretion; it therefore acts as an endocrine, autocrine/paracrine, and intracrine hormone.

ACE is a target of ACE inhibitor drugs, which decrease the rate of angiotensin II production. Angiotensin II increases blood pressure by stimulating the Gq protein in vascular smooth muscle cells (which in turn activates an IP3-dependent mechanism leading to a rise in intracellular calcium levels and ultimately causing contraction). In addition, angiotensin II acts at the Na+/H+ exchanger in the proximal tubules of the kidney to stimulate Na+ reabsorption and H+ excretion which is coupled to bicarbonate reabsorption. This ultimately results in an increase in blood volume, pressure, and pH. Hence, ACE inhibitors are major anti-hypertensive drugs.

Other cleavage products of ACE, seven or nine amino acids long, are also known; they have differential affinity for angiotensin receptors, although their exact role is still unclear. The action of AII itself is targeted by angiotensin II receptor antagonists, which directly block angiotensin II AT1 receptors.

Angiotensin II is degraded to angiotensin III by angiotensinases located in red blood cells and the vascular beds of most tissues. It has a half-life in circulation of around 30 seconds, whereas, in tissue, it may be as long as 15–30 minutes.

Angiotensin II results in increased inotropy, chronotropy, catecholamine (norepinephrine) release, catecholamine sensitivity, aldosterone levels, vasopressin levels, and cardiac remodeling and vasoconstriction through AT1 receptors on peripheral vessels (conversely, AT2 receptors impair cardiac remodeling). This is why ACE inhibitors and ARBs help to prevent remodeling that occurs secondary to angiotensin II and are beneficial in congestive heart failure.

Angiotensin III 

Asp | Arg-Val-Tyr-Ile-His-Pro-Phe

Angiotensin III, along with angiotensin II, is considered an active peptide derived from angiotensinogen.

Angiotensin III has 40% of the pressor activity of angiotensin II, but 100% of the aldosterone-producing activity. Increases mean arterial pressure. It is a peptide that is formed by removing an amino acid from angiotensin II by glutamyl aminopeptidase A, which cleaves the N-terminal Asp residue. 

Activation of the AT2 receptor by angiotensin III triggers natriuresis, while AT2 activation via angiotensin II does not. This natriuretic response via angiotensin III occurs when the AT1 receptor is blocked.

Angiotensin IV 

Arg | Val-Tyr-Ile-His-Pro-Phe

Angiotensin IV is a hexapeptide that, like angiotensin III, has some lesser activity. Angiotensin IV has a wide range of activities in the central nervous system.

The exact identity of AT4 receptors has not been established. There is evidence that the AT4 receptor is insulin-regulated aminopeptidase (IRAP). There is also evidence that angiotensin IV interacts with the HGF system through the c-Met receptor.

Synthetic small molecule analogues of angiotensin IV with the ability to penetrate through blood brain barrier have been developed.

The AT4 site may be involved in memory acquisition and recall, as well as blood flow regulation. Angiotensin IV and its analogs may also benefit spatial memory tasks such as object recognition and avoidance (conditioned and passive avoidance). Studies have also shown that the usual biological effects of angiotensin IV on the body are not affected by common AT2 receptor antagonists such as the hypertension medication Losartan.

Effects 
See also Renin–angiotensin system#Effects
Angiotensins II, III and IV have a number of effects throughout the body:

Adipic 
Angiotensins "modulate fat mass expansion through upregulation of adipose tissue lipogenesis ... and downregulation of lipolysis."

Cardiovascular 

Angiotensins are potent direct vasoconstrictors, constricting arteries and increasing blood pressure. This effect is achieved through activation of the GPCR AT1, which signals through a Gq protein to activate phospholipase C, and subsequently increase intracellular calcium.

Angiotensin II has prothrombotic potential through adhesion and aggregation of platelets and stimulation of PAI-1 and PAI-2.

Neural 

Angiotensin II increases thirst sensation (dipsogen) through the area postrema and subfornical organ of the brain, decreases the response of the baroreceptor reflex, increases the desire for salt, increases secretion of ADH from the posterior pituitary, and increases secretion of ACTH from the anterior pituitary. Some evidence suggests that it acts on the organum vasculosum of the lamina terminalis (OVLT) as well.

Adrenal 
Angiotensin II acts on the adrenal cortex, causing it to release aldosterone, a hormone that causes the kidneys to retain sodium and lose potassium. Elevated plasma angiotensin II levels are responsible for the elevated aldosterone levels present during the luteal phase of the menstrual cycle.

Renal 
Angiotensin II has a direct effect on the proximal tubules to increase Na+ reabsorption. It has a complex and variable effect on glomerular filtration and renal blood flow depending on the setting. Increases in systemic blood pressure will maintain renal perfusion pressure; however, constriction of the afferent and efferent glomerular arterioles will tend to restrict renal blood flow. The effect on the efferent arteriolar resistance is, however, markedly greater, in part due to its smaller basal diameter; this tends to increase glomerular capillary hydrostatic pressure and maintain glomerular filtration rate. A number of other mechanisms can affect renal blood flow and GFR. High concentrations of Angiotensin II can constrict the glomerular mesangium, reducing the area for glomerular filtration. Angiotensin II is a sensitizer to tubuloglomerular feedback, preventing an excessive rise in GFR. Angiotensin II causes the local release of prostaglandins, which, in turn, antagonize renal vasoconstriction. The net effect of these competing mechanisms on glomerular filtration will vary with the physiological and pharmacological environment.

See also 

 ACE inhibitor
 Angiotensin receptor
 Angiotensin II receptor antagonist
 Captopril
 Perindopril
 Renin inhibitor

References

Further reading 

 
 Brenner & Rector's The Kidney, 7th ed., Saunders, 2004.
 Mosby's Medical Dictionary, 3rd Ed., CV Mosby Company, 1990.
 Review of Medical Physiology, 20th Ed., William F. Ganong, McGraw-Hill, 2001.
 Clinical Physiology of Acid-Base and Electrolyte Disorders, 5th ed., Burton David Rose & Theodore W. Post McGraw-Hill, 2001

External links 

 The MEROPS online database for peptidases and their inhibitors: I04.953
 
 
 

Peptide hormones
Angiology
Endocrinology
Hypertension
Hexapeptides